Dominique Stroobant (born March 16, 1947) is a Belgian sculptor, photographer and graphic artist living in Italy.

Life 
Since 1970 he has been living in Carrara, where he resides and works in the small hamlet of Miseglia.

In 1972 he created with Kenneth Davis and Philippe Toussaint the Floating Stones Group.

In 1976 he started his collaboration with the enterprise Fratelli Biselli SpA, one of the first two to cut granite since the 1950s in Carrara.

With Paolo Gioli he was one of the photographer who developed pinhole photography in Europe.  In 1977 he documented with his selft-built pinhole camera the movement of the sun.

He worked with Max Bill. Amongst their most important artwork is the sculpture Kontinuität in Frankfurt.

He has been a friend and collaborator of ZERO artist Jef Verheyen.

In 1988 he carved a memorial for the casualties of the 1956 mining accident of Marcinelle, inside the site of the coal mine.

In 2013 he was the moderator at the round table discussion "Visivi. La fotografia attraverso i linguaggi contemporanei" ("Visual. Photography through contemporary languages"), in Florence at Museo Galileo.

Work 
Stroobant was mainly known in his early years for the investigation of the reuse of industrial materials, but later focused his attention on political and philosophical themes. 

Another the crucial aspect of his activity is also the role of scientific principles in art.

Gallery

Books

Documentaries 
Behind these Stones - Dietro i sassi Film and Photography Catalogue presented at the 37th Venice Biennale, Flemish Ministry of the Arts, Belgium, (1976)
Non son l’uno per cento, anarchici a Carrara (I am not the one percent, anarchists in Carrara), Antonio Morabito (2006)

Exhibitions 
 Behind those stones, Biennale of Venice, 1978.
L'art et le temps. Regards sur la quatrième dimension, Institut d'art contemporain de Villeurbanne, December 1985-January 1986
 The international Pinhole Photography exhibition, Contemporary Arts Museum Houston, June 30 – September 9, 1990
 Senza Obiettivo, International Exhibition of Pinhole Photography, Santa Maria della Scala (Siena) Museum, October 31 - November 17, 2002, Siena - XI Visionaria Festival
 Artempo at Fortuny Museum a show by curator and interior designer Axel Vervoordt's that investigates time in art.

Personal life 
He met in 1969 South-African Mona Johnson (from Cape Town) and had two children, Ish-maël (*1972) and Mascha (*1978).

References

External links
 
 

1947 births
20th-century Belgian sculptors
21st-century Belgian sculptors
Photographers from Antwerp
Belgian sculptors
Living people